Tarkin may refer to:

Grand Moff Tarkin, a fictional character in the Star Wars franchise
Star Wars: Tarkin, a 2014 novel about the character
Tarkin, Scottish saint called also Talarican
Tarkin (codec), an Ogg video codec

See also
Takin
Tarin (disambiguation)
Tarquin (disambiguation)